Joseph Malerba (born 5 October 1962) is a French actor known for his role as police detective Walter Morlighem in the French TV series Braquo. He has appeared in numerous films, television productions, and theatre plays since 1992.

Selected filmography

Film

Television

External links

1962 births
Living people
French male film actors
French male television actors
Male actors from Paris
20th-century French male actors
21st-century French male actors
Cours Florent alumni